Electrowerkz is a three-floor music venue in Islington, London. In addition to mainstream club nights, it hosts the regular goth night club Slimelight and many other club, live music and events.

Layout

Electrowerkz has three floors. Much of the layout of the ground floor was shaped to accommodate Carsten Höller's pop-up restaurant which used the venue in November 2008–July 2009. The club's dilapidated appearance has been praised for adding to the "gritty warehouse feel" and adding to the club's charm.

Slimelight

Slimelight, also known as "Slimes", is a dark scene night club which covers such genres as goth, industrial, dark techno, dark electro, and darkwave, which has existed at The Electrowerkz since 1987.

As well as DJs, Slimelight also regularly has live acts before the club or during it. Artists who have performed at Slimelight include VNV Nation, The Crüxshadows, Combichrist, Clan of Xymox and Nitzer Ebb. 

To comply with the law when Slimelight began in the 1980s, the club has a membership scheme that requires getting existing members to approve new members. Although this is no longer necessary, the membership scheme still exists and provides members with a cheaper entrance fee. Most of the ground floor exists in its current state due to a pop up restaurant from Carsten Höller which co-existed with the club for several months.

While UK entertainment venues were restricted from holding in-person events during the COVID-19 pandemic, the club moved online with multiple livestream DJ events on Twitch.

Other events

Under the name The Werkz, Electrowerkz makes itself available as a venue for weddings, product launches and as a film location.

Electrowerkz was a filming location for the Black Mirror episode San Junipero.

Club reviewers have praised the venue for the variety of club nights

Mayuan Mak
Mayuan Mak was the owner of Electrowerkz until his death in December 2020. He was also the co-founder of Slimelight.

A tank was used as a hearse to drive his body to his funeral.

References

External links
 

Nightclubs in London
Goth venues
Goth subculture
Industrial music
Electronic dance music venues
Club nights